The name Kenneth has been used for four tropical cyclones in the Eastern Pacific Ocean and one in the South-West Indian Ocean.

In the Eastern Pacific:
 Hurricane Kenneth (1993) – Category 4 hurricane that did not affect land.
 Hurricane Kenneth (2005) – Category 4 hurricane whose remnants brought heavy rainfall to Hawaii.
 Hurricane Kenneth (2011) – Category 4 hurricane that did not affect land.
 Hurricane Kenneth (2017) – Category 4 hurricane that did not affect land.

South-West Indian Ocean:
 Cyclone Kenneth (2019) – Category 4 equivalent tropical cyclone that made landfall in Mozambique.

Pacific hurricane set index articles
South-West Indian Ocean cyclone set index articles